Afshin Noroozi (born 22 April 1985 in Ahvaz) is an Iranian table tennis player.

References
 sports-reference.com

Table tennis players at the 2008 Summer Olympics
Iranian male table tennis players
1985 births
Living people
Olympic table tennis players of Iran
Table tennis players at the 2010 Asian Games
Table tennis players at the 2014 Asian Games
Table tennis players at the 2018 Asian Games
Asian Games competitors for Iran
People from Ahvaz
Sportspeople from Khuzestan province
20th-century Iranian people
21st-century Iranian people
Islamic Solidarity Games competitors for Iran